Pseudancistrus sidereus is a species of armored catfish known only from the upper Orinoco basin in Amazonas state, Venezuela.

This is a fairly large loricariid (up to  standard length), and is distinguished from its congeners by a strong keel on the caudal peduncle and the colour scheme which is generally very dark with bright white or yellow spots on the upperside.

References

Ancistrini
Taxa named by Jonathan W. Armbruster
Fish described in 2004
Fish of South America
Fish of Venezuela